Kurt Hutton (born Kurt Hübschmann; 1893 in Strasbourg – 1960) was a German-born photographer who pioneered photojournalism in England.

Life
Beginning his career with the Dephot agency in Germany, he migrated to England in 1934 and worked for Weekly Illustrated.

He then became one of the founding staff of the groundbreaking pictorial weekly news magazine Picture Post. One of his most famous images used there showed working-class girls enjoying themselves in Funfair, Southend, Essex (1938).

He spent the last decade of his life living in Aldeburgh where he photographed for Benjamin Britten.

References

1893 births
1960 deaths
English photojournalists
German photojournalists
Artists from Strasbourg
German emigrants to the United Kingdom
Picture Post photojournalists